The 2008–09 Iowa Hawkeyes men's basketball team represented The University of Iowa in the 2008–09 college basketball season. The team was led by head coach Todd Lickliter.  The team played their home games at Carver-Hawkeye Arena, which the team has done since 1983.

Roster

Schedule and Results 

|-
!colspan=9 style=| Exhibition

|-
!colspan=9 style=| Regular season

|-
!colspan=9 style=| Big Ten tournament

References 

Iowa Hawkeyes men's basketball seasons
Iowa
Hawk
Hawk